Shai Zakai is a photographer, artist, and ecological activist known for her artworks involving water reclamation.

Life
Zakai was born in Tel Aviv in 1957. She studied at Hadassah College, Jerusalem and at Hebrew University.

Work
Zakai's best-known piece of art is Concrete Creek, a three-year project started in 1999 that documented the cleanup of a concrete-polluted creek in the Valley of Elah. The piece includes video and photo documentary of the cleanup, as well as a sculpture created from the cleaned-up waste.

Zakai founded the Israeli Forum for Ecological Art in 1999 to encourage the development of ecological art in Israel and the world.

References

Israeli women artists
Israeli environmentalists
Israeli women environmentalists
Living people
1957 births
Artists from Tel Aviv
Hebrew University of Jerusalem alumni
Environmental artists